Inder Dutt Lakhanpal (born 27 October 1962) is an Indian politician, who currently serves as Member of Legislative Assembly from Barsar constituency. Inder Dutt Lakhanpal won from Barsar constituency in 2017 state assembly elections. He is two times Member of Himachal Pradesh Legislative Assembly.

Early life and education
Inder Dutt Lakhanpal was born on 27 October 1962 in Shimla, Himachal Pradesh to Salig Ram Lakhanpal.

He had done graduation in B.A. from Himachal Pradesh University.

Politics
Inder Dutt Lakhanpal was active in local politics from 1997. While Lakhanpal's active state politics started from 2012, when he became MLA to state legislature.

He previously won Himachal Pradesh Legislative Assembly Election in 2012.

Then in 2017, he was re-elected to the thirteenth Himachal Pradesh Legislative Assembly in December, 2017.

References

Indian National Congress politicians from Himachal Pradesh
1962 births
Living people
Himachal Pradesh MLAs 2017–2022